The Thames Challenge Cup is a rowing event for men's eights at the annual Henley Royal Regatta on the River Thames at Henley-on-Thames in England.  It is open to male crews from a single rowing club.

Boat clubs from any university, college or secondary school are not permitted, neither are squad oarsmen seeking selection for F.I.S.A. Heavyweight or Lightweight Championships. A crew may not include oarsmen who have rowed or sculled in an Olympic Games or a F.I.S.A. Senior World Championships for Heavyweights or Lightweights or who have won a medal at World Under 23 Championships (or the World Under 23 Regatta or The Nations' Cup).

Past winners

External links
 Thames Challenge Cup 2001 
 Video Thames Challenge Cup Winner 2001

References

Events at Henley Royal Regatta
Rowing trophies and awards